Jacques Livage (born 26 October 1938 in Neuilly-sur-Seine) is a French chemist holding the chair of condensed matter chemistry at the Collège de France and a member of the Académie des sciences.

Biography 
In 1960, he obtained an engineering degree from the École nationale supérieure de chimie de Paris where he also obtained a doctorate. He was an assistant and then a master assistant at the same school from 1960 to 1973. He has been a professor at the Pierre-et-Marie Curie University since 1973 and a professor at the Collège de France since 2001.

Scientific work 
Jacques Livage is a pioneer in the field of soft chemistry. In particular, he has developed sol-gel processes to obtain original materials that are inaccessible through the traditional channels of inorganic chemistry. His work aims in particular to copy biomineralisation processes, which are natural processes that make it possible to obtain glass-type materials under particularly mild conditions compared to conventional production processes. The industrial applications of such a chemistry are considerable.

He has published more than 500 scientific articles.

Awards and honours 

    Yvan Peyches Prize from the French Academy of sciences in 1980
    Member of the International Academy of Ceramics in 1995
    Member of the Institut universitaire de France from 1996 to 2001
    Member of the French Academy of sciences since 1999
    Chevalier of the Légion d'honneur in 2003

Books 

    Theoretical chemistry: concepts and problems, Hermann, 1972
    Materials: present and future" Rhône Poulenc Recherches, 1990
    Les gels, Elsevier, 1995.
    De la solution à l'oxyde, EDP Sciences et Éditions du CNRS, 1998.
    Metal oxide chemistry and synthesis, J. Wiley, 2000.
    Chemistry of condensed matter, Fayard, 2003.

References

1938 births
People from Neuilly-sur-Seine
20th-century French chemists
21st-century French chemists
Members of the French Academy of Sciences
University of Paris alumni
Academic staff of Pierre and Marie Curie University
Living people